Mongolian Revolution may refer to:
The Mongolian Revolution of 1911
The Mongolian Revolution of 1921
The Mongolian Revolution of 1990